The Botanical Garden of the First Moscow State Medical University named after Sechenov is a botanical garden in Moscow. Located on the left bank of the Moskva River near the station MCC "Business Center". It was founded in 1946. The garden area is 4.95 hectares. The Botanical Garden has the status of a specially protected natural area of regional importance.

History and description 
The Botanical Garden of the Moscow Pharmaceutical Institute (now the First Moscow State Medical University named after I. M. Sechenov) was established on September 25, 1946, as a base for students' practical training and scientific work. The garden project was designed by its first director, B. M. Giner, together with the botanist V. N. Voroshilov. The first plants were planted in the spring of 1947. By 1949, more than 100 species of wood and shrub plants were planted. In the 1950s and 1960s, geneticists and breeders A. R. Zhebrak and V. V. Sakharov carried out experiments in the botanical garden.

In 2016, the Botanical Garden was first opened for free sightseeing visits.

The area of the botanical garden is 4.95 ha, 2.5 hectares of which is occupied by the arboretum. There is also a nursery of herbaceous plants (0.5 ha) and experimental sites (0.5 ha), where medicinal plants predominate.

According to data for 2016, about 1505 species of plants grow in the botanical garden, including a rare blossoming magnolia 6 m tall kobus. Also relic ginkgo is bilobate, Meyer's fir, wolfberry, Caucasian hellebore, hydrangea petiolate and others.

References 

1946 establishments in Russia
Botanical gardens in Russia
Parks and gardens in Moscow
Cultural heritage monuments of regional significance in Moscow